The Hardee Correctional Institution is a state prison for men located in Bowling Green, Hardee County, Florida, owned and operated by the Florida Department of Corrections.  

This facility has a mix of security levels, including minimum, medium, and close, and houses adult male offenders.  Hardee first opened in 1991 and has a maximum capacity of 1541 prisoners.

References

Prisons in Florida
Buildings and structures in Hardee County, Florida
1991 establishments in Florida